Dykanka is an urban-type settlement and formerly the administrative center of Dykanka Raion. It is now administrated under Poltava Raion of Poltava Oblast in central Ukraine. Population: 

History

Ancient History
Dykanka was first mentioned in 1658 as a small village, though the area was populated for centuries before. Within the area of modern Dykanka, traces exist of Scythian settlement at various times. Also found were the remains of a settlement that had at one point been razed and the remains of two settlements from the 7th-6th centuries BC.

Medieval History
In 1430, the Dykanka area came under the ownership of Tatar Murza Leksada Mansurksanovych, the future Prince Alexander Glinski, and, according to Leo Padalka and other pre-revolutionary (before 1917) historians, Dykanka was among his ″settlements″.

Modern History
Dykanka has held the status of urban-type settlement since 1957.

Culture
Dykanka is the location of the short story collection Evenings on a Farm Near Dikanka by Nikolai Gogol. The tale of St John's Eve, concerning the family of the Church Sexton, inspired Mussorgsky's tone poem Night on the Bare Mountain.

Gallery

References

External links
 "Dikanka" (news of Dikanka, events, weather, all in English and Russian language)

Urban-type settlements in Poltava Raion
Poltavsky Uyezd
Populated places established in 1957